The 1978 E3 Harelbeke was the 21st edition of the E3 Harelbeke cycle race and was held on 1 April 1978. The race started and finished in Harelbeke. The race was won by Freddy Maertens.

General classification

References

1978
1978 in Belgian sport
1978 in road cycling
April 1978 sports events in Europe